Ogrezeni is a commune located in Giurgiu County, Muntenia, Romania. It is composed of two villages, Hobaia and Ogrezeni.

Natives
 Marin Dună

References

Communes in Giurgiu County
Localities in Muntenia